Arthur William Miller (1854 – September 4, 1934) was a politician in Newfoundland. He represented Trinity in the Newfoundland House of Assembly from 1904 to 1909 as a Liberal.

The son of Samuel Miller and Amy Ivany, he was born in New Bonaventure and was educated there. Miller married Mary Carter. He worked as a commercial traveller and mercantile agent in the Bonavista Bay and Trinity Bay regions. He was defeated when he ran for re-election in 1909. Miller served as superintendent of the Poor Asylum at St. John's from 1920 to 1930. He died at St. John's in 1934.

References 

1854 births
1934 deaths
Liberal Party of Newfoundland and Labrador MHAs
People from Newfoundland (island)